Thromidia is a genus of starfish in the family Mithrodiidae.

Description and characteristics 
These are unusually massive sea stars with five sausage-shaped arms, containing probably the heaviest species of Asteroidea, up to 6 kg.

Species 
There are four recognized species according to World Register of Marine Species:
 Thromidia brycei Marsh, 2009 – Western Australia
 Thromidia catalai Pope & Rowe, 1977 – West Pacific
 Thromidia gigas (Mortensen, 1935) – South-west Indian ocean
 Thromidia seychellesensis Pope & Rowe, 1977 – Seychelles

References

Mithrodiidae
Asteroidea genera